The Astor House, at 822 12th St. in Golden, Colorado, is a historic stone hotel from the earliest years of Golden, Colorado, United States. It was built in 1867.  It has also been known as the Astor House Hotel, the Lake House and as Castle Rock House.  It is now the Astor House Hotel Museum.

Associated with prominent area pioneers, it was also a pioneering effort in historic preservation in the region.  Today it is a museum open to the public, and was listed on the National Register of Historic Places in 1973.

It is a two-story building built from hand-cut sandstone.

History
The Astor House was originally built in 1867 by Seth Lake, a pioneer hotelkeeper who came to the area in the early 1860s.  An upgrade from his original Lake House hotel on the site, it was carved of sandstone quarried by Charles R. Foreman & Co. at the far west end of 12th Street, upon which the hotel stands.  The premier hostelry of Golden, it served patrons from miners to Territorial legislators, who met nearby in the Territorial Capitol.  It was Golden's only known hotel not to have served alcohol, as the devout Baptist owner was a temperance man who would not allow it on his premises.  Later, the hotel was owned by German immigrant Ida Goetze.  It gradually faded from hotel to boarding house, and was altered by four fires and repaired to its present appearance.

Preservation
In 1971, the property was acquired by the Golden Downtown Improvement District to be destroyed for a parking lot, a fate befalling a number of Golden's landmarks, including the church Lake had faithfully served.  City Councilor Ruben Hartmeister raised concerns about whether a place of its history should be preserved. Standing alone, he was not initially listened to, but Golden's modern historic preservation movement was born.  Citizens rallied to the aid of the Astor House and formed the Golden Landmarks Association to try to save it.  On June 13, 1972, Golden's people voted to save it, with 69% voting in favor.  Afterward, it became the Astor House Hotel Museum, which is no longer open to the general public today as a historic house museum.  The museum depicted life in the hotel in the early 20th century.

See also
National Register of Historic Places listings in Jefferson County, Colorado

References

External links
Astor House Museum
Golden Landmarks Association

		
Buildings and structures in Golden, Colorado
Hotel buildings completed in 1867
Hotel buildings on the National Register of Historic Places in Colorado
Historic house museums in Colorado
Museums in Golden, Colorado
1867 establishments in Colorado Territory
National Register of Historic Places in Jefferson County, Colorado